Rochester, New York in the United States, and its suburbs, is or has been home to many famous individuals. These people include businessmen, civil rights activists, politicians, entertainers, educators, athletes and much more. Three prominent Rochesterians in the national consciousness are abolitionist Frederick Douglass, suffragist Susan B. Anthony, and inventor-philanthropist George Eastman.

Academics
 Martin Brewer Anderson, first president of University of Rochester
 Richard N. Aslin, developmental psychologist at the University of Rochester
 Dave Bayer (b. 1955), mathematician at Barnard College, Columbia University
 Boris Bittker, legal academic
 Harry Gideonse (1901–1985), President of Brooklyn College, and Chancellor of the New School for Social Research
 Hilda Conrady Kingslake, optics engineer
 Rudolf Kingslake, optics engineer
 Joy Ladin, professor, poet, and theologian
 Edgar Lane (1923–1964), American professor of political science
 Michael A. Marletta, biochemist, MacArthur Fellow, former CEO of Scripps Research Institute
 E. C. Mills, educator
 H. Allen Orr, evolutionary biologist, winner of the Darwin-Wallace Medal
 Robert Putnam, Harvard professor
 Richard W. Rahn, economist
 Kenneth Rogoff, Harvard professor
 Joel Seligman, former president of the University of Rochester
 Eugene H. Spafford, Purdue University professor
 Ching W. Tang, 2011 recipient of the Wolf Prize in Chemistry
 Robert E. Wright, Nef Family Chair of Political Economy, Augustana College, South Dakota

Architects and designers
 Claude Fayette Bragdon, architect
 Harvey Ellis, architect
 Robert Trent Jones, golf course architect
 Ramón Santiago, artist
 Fletcher Steele, landscape designer
 Clarence Stein, urban planner, architect and writer who advocated for the Garden City Movement
 John Rochester Thomas, architect
 Andrew Jackson Warner, architect
 J. Foster Warner, architect

Athletes
Like most cities, Rochester has its share of famous (and not-so-famous) athletes.  Among the biggest names are Walter Hagen in golf, Johnny Antonelli in baseball, Brian Gionta and Ryan Callahan in hockey, Abby Wambach in soccer, and Jon "Bones" Jones in mixed martial arts.

Baseball
 Johnny Antonelli, MLB
 Ross Barnes, hit the first recorded home run in professional baseball
 Bernie Boland
 Chris Bostick, Indianapolis Indians, Pittsburgh Pirates
 Cito Culver, 2010 first-round draft pick
 Heinie Groh, MLB
 Mike Jones, MLB
 Bob Keegan, MLB
Michael King (baseball) Professional Baseball pitcher for the New York Yankees
 Andy Parrino, MLB
 Charley Radbourn, MLB
 Tim Redding, MLB
 George Selkirk, MLB

Basketball
 Joe Arlauckas
 Joe Binion
 Thomas Bryant, NBA
 Al Butler, NBA
 Marty Byrnes, NBA
 Al Cervi, NBA player and coach
 Les Harrison, NBA player and coach
 Mark Jones, NBA
 Anthony Lamb, NBA
 Jack Leasure
 Art Long, NBA
 Mauro Panaggio
 Ryan Pettinella
 Robert Rose, NBA and NBL (Australia) player; won the NBL MVP award (1993, 2001), NBL champion 1992
 Isaiah Stewart,  NBA
 Jeff Van Gundy, NBA coach
 Stan Van Gundy, NBA coach
 Bernie Voorheis, NBL
 John Wallace, NBA

Combat sports
 Carmen Basilio, champion boxer
 Gregor Gillespie, lightweight fighter in the UFC, also known as "The Gift"
 Desmond Green, featherweight fighter in UFC
 Jon "Bones" Jones, UFC light heavyweight champion
 Willie Monroe, Jr., middleweight boxer
 Charles "The Natural" Murray, light welterweight boxer
 Hanna Thompson, fencer, 2008 Olympic silver medalist (team foil)
 Frank Trigg, welterweight fighter in the UFC
 Bobby Weaver, freestyle wrestler, 1984 Olympic gold medalist
 Felicia Zimmerman, fencer, 1996 and 2000 Olympics
 Iris Zimmerman, fencer, 2000 Olympics

Professional wrestling
 Johnny Barend
 Dalton Castle
 Colin Delaney, WWE
 Jonathan Huber, ring names Luke Harper and Brodie Lee
 Joanie "Chyna" Laurer
 Gorilla Monsoon
 The Roadblock

Football
 Branden Albert, NFL
 Cris Crissy, NFL
 Don Davey, NFL
 Quentin Gause, NFL
 Tony Green, NFL
 Don Holleder, college football star and Vietnam War hero
 Ernest Jackson, CFL
 T. J. Jackson,  NFL
 Arthur Jones, NFL
 Chandler Jones, NFL
 Tony Jordan, NFL
 Jim Kane, NFL
 Pat Kelly, NFL
 Rob Konrad, NFL
 Brian Kozlowski, NFL
 Leo Lyons, founder of the NFL's Rochester Jeffersons
 Kevin McMahan, NFL
 Seth Payne, NFL (Victor)
 Adam Podlesh, NFL
 A. J. Terrell, NFL
 Robert R. Thomas, Chief Justice of the Supreme Court of Illinois and former NFL player
 David Walker, NCAA coach
 Roland Williams, NFL
 Marcus Wilson, NFL
 Alan Zemaitis, NFL

Golf
 Don Allen, championship amateur golfer
 Terry Diehl, PGA Tour
 Danielle Downey, LPGA player
 Walter Hagen, PGA legend
 Calvin Peete, African-American PGA Tour pioneer
 Jeff Sluman, PGA Tour and Champions Tour
 Sam Urzetta, 1950 U.S. Amateur Champion and professional golfer

Hockey
 Dan Conway, Floor Hockey Professional-retired
 Scott Bartlett, ECHL
 Mike Battaglia, ECHL
 Jason Bonsignore, NHL
 Ryan Callahan, NHL
 Adam Clendening, NHL
 Chris Collins, AHL
 David Farrance, NHL
 Rory Fitzpatrick, NHL
 Brian Gionta, NHL
 Stephen Gionta, NHL
 Kim Insalaco, Olympic medalist
 Connor Knapp, NHL
 Matt Lane
 Phil Lane, AHL, EURO
 Shane Prince, NHL
 Marty Reasoner, NHL
 David Shields, AHL
 Francis Spain, 1936 Winter Olympic bronze medalist
 Lyndsay Wall, Olympic medalist
 Derek Whitmore, NHL

Lacrosse
 Paul Cantabene
 Grant Catalino, MLL
 Dan Conway, Greece Athena HS- retired
 Pat Cougevan, NLL
 Sean Doyle, MLL
 Shawn Nadelen, NLL and MLL
 Brett Queener, NLL and MLL
 Chris Schiller, NLL and MLL
 Tim Soudan
 Joe Walters, NLL and MLL

Soccer
 Jordan Allen, MLS
 Brian Bliss, MLS
 Josh Bolton, USL
 Dema Kovalenko, MLS
 Daniel Lynd, USL
 Angelo Panzetta, retired professional soccer player
 Mike Reidy, USL 
 Dave Sarachan, NASL, Team USA
 Lydia Vandenbergh, WPS
 Abby Wambach, two-time Olympic gold medalist, Women's World Cup Champion, all-time highest scoring international player

Swimming and diving

 Kara Lynn Joyce, Olympic medalist
 Ryan Lochte, 11-time Olympic medalist
 Richard Saeger, 1984 Olympic gold medalist
 Wendy Wyland, 1984 Olympic medalist, diving

Other athletes
 Kim Batten, track and field, 1996 Olympic silver medalist in triple jump
 Dick Buerkle, athlete, former world-record holder, indoor mile
 Paige Conners, Olympic ice dancer for Israel
 William Cox, athlete, 1924 Olympic medalist
 Irving Crane, billiards, six-time world champion, Billiard Congress of America Hall of Famer
 Louis Fox, 1865 national billiards champion
 Doug Kent, professional bowler, 2006–07 PBA Player of the Year
 A.J. Kitt, downhill skier, 1988–98 Olympics
 Jason McElwain, basketball personality
 Danny Padilla, bodybuilder, "The Giant Killer"
 Stacey Pensgen, figure skater and meteorologist
 Pete Pfitzinger, marathoner, 1984 and 1988 U.S. Olympics
 Frank Ritter Shumway, figure skater
 Mike Sigel, billiards, Billiard Congress of America Hall of Famer
 Jenn Suhr (née Stuczynski), 2012 Olympic gold medalist, pole vault
 Maynard Troyer, NASCAR
 Cathy Turner, Olympic gold medalist, short-track speed skating
 Jason Turner, 2008 Olympic medalist, air pistol

Coaches
 Joe Altobelli, baseball manager
 Richard Callaghan, figure skater and coach
 Dave Sarachan, soccer player and coach

Officials
 Nick Bremigan, MLB umpire
 Maia Chaka, first black woman hired as NFL official
 Jimmy Debell, NFL official
 Ken Kaiser, MLB baseball umpire
 Bill Klem, umpire in Baseball Hall of Fame; umpired in a record 18 World Series
 Silk O'Loughlin, MLB baseball umpire

Executives
See #Sports executives, below

Broadcasters
See #Sport broadcasters, below

Businesspeople
Rochester's history of innovation and progress is reflected in the long list of notable businessmen who founded their companies here.  Eastman Kodak, Bausch + Lomb, Xerox, Gannett Company, and Western Union all trace their roots to Rochester.
 Charles August, co-founder of Monro Muffler Brake
 John Jacob Bausch, co-founder of Bausch & Lomb
 Thasunda Duckett, CEO of Teachers Insurance and Annuity Association of America and former JPMorgan Chase executive
 Thomas B. Dunn, founder of perfume manufacturer T.B. Dunn, and inventor of Sen-Sen breath candy
 George Eastman, Eastman Kodak founder
 Charles J. Folger, lawyer, jurist and statesman
 Frank Gannett, founder of Gannett newspapers; presidential candidate
 Malcolm Glazer, CEO of First Allied; owner of Tampa Bay Buccaneers and Manchester United
 Kate Gleason, first female mechanical engineer
 Tom Golisano, Paychex founder, philanthropist, gubernatorial candidate; owner of NHL's Buffalo Sabres (2003–2010)
 Martha Matilda Harper, hair care entrepreneur
 Leonard Jerome, financier, "King of Wall Street"; grandfather of Sir Winston Churchill
 David T. Kearns, Xerox CEO and Deputy Secretary of Education
 Henry Lomb, co-founder of Bausch & Lomb
 Ralph Peo, inventor, founder of Frontier Industries, CEO & Chairman of Houdaille Industries
 Arthur Rock, venture capitalist
 James Satloff, founder of Liberty Skis 
 Hiram Sibley, Western Union co-founder
 Henry A. Strong, Eastman Kodak co-founder and president
 Hulbert Harrington Warner, patent medicine sales
 Don Alonzo Watson, Western Union co-founder
 Robert Wegman, Wegmans Food Markets
 Henry Wells, founder of American Express and co-founder of Wells Fargo
 Joseph C. Wilson, founder of Xerox Corporation
 Luke Wood, president of Beats Electronics

Computing and Internet
 Eric Bauman, founder of eBaum's World
 Paul Buchheit, creator of Gmail and AdSense; founder of FriendFeed
 Burnie Burns, co-founder of Rooster Teeth, an online video production company
 Diane Greene, founder of VMware

Inventors
 William Seward Burroughs I
 Matthew Ewing, carpenter and inventor
 James Caleb Jackson, Granula
 Daniel Myron LeFever, gun maker and inventor of the hammerless shotgun
 C. J. Rapp, Jolt Cola
 John Samuel Rowell, agricultural inventor and manufacturing industrialist
 Steve Sasson, demonstrated first digital electronic camera
 George B. Selden, automotive pioneer
 S. Donald Stookey, inventor of CorningWare

Sports executives
 Steve Donner, hockey
 Kim Pegula, co-owner and president, Buffalo Sabres, Buffalo Bills, Buffalo Bandits, Rochester Americans
 Morrie Silver, minor-league baseball

Criminals (suspected or convicted)
 The Alphabet Killer, cold case
 Kenneth Bianchi, one of the Hillside Stranglers
 Angelo Buono, Jr., one of the Hillside Stranglers
 Joseph Naso, serial killer
 Arthur Shawcross, serial killer
 Francis Tumblety, one of the Jack the Ripper suspects

Entertainers

Actors and models

The most acclaimed actor to come out of the Rochester area is Academy Award winner Philip Seymour Hoffman; prior to him, Rochester's main claim to fame on stage and screen was Robert Forster. John Lithgow was born (but not raised) in Rochester, and Louise Brooks died in Rochester after many years as a recluse there.  Other popular Rochesterians on the screen include comedian Kristen Wiig and voice actor Vincent Martella.
 Tyson Beckford, fashion model and television personality
 John Bolton, actor, A Christmas Story: The Musical
 Pandora Boxx, drag queen, Rupauls Drag Race Season 2, All Stars 1, All Stars 6
 Peter Breck, actor, "The Big Valley" Western series, "Thunder Road" movie, guest starred in many TV shows and acted in Theater productions
 Louise Brooks, actress of 1920s and 30s
 Burnie Burns, voice actor, Red Vs. Blue; co-founder of Rooster Teeth
 Donna Lynne Champlin, Broadway actress
 Julie Lynn Cialini, Playboy model
 Jordan Clarke, actor, Guiding Light
 Jennifer Cody, dancer and actress
 Mrs. Kasha Davis, drag queen, Rupauls Drag Race Season 7
 Taye Diggs, actor, Rent, Private Practice
 Pete Duel, actor, Alias Smith and Jones
 Winston Duke, actor, Black Panther
 Marilyn Erskine, actress
 Dan Finnerty, singer and actor
 Nicole Fiscella, actress, Gossip Girl
 Robert Forster, Oscar-nominated actor, Jackie Brown
 Susan Gibney, actress, Crossing Jordan
 Rachel Hilbert, model, Victoria's Secret
 Che Holloway, actor, Dark Justice
 Philip Seymour Hoffman, Oscar-winning actor
 Tom Keene, western actor
 Mimi Kennedy, actress and activist
 Norman Kerry, silent film actor
 Darienne Lake, drag queen, Rupauls Drag Race Season 6
 Hudson Leick, actress, Xena: Warrior Princess
 Kara Lindsay, actress, Newsies
 John Lithgow, Oscar, Tony and Emmy-nominated actor
 Rick Lyon, Broadway puppeteer and puppet designer
 Vincent Martella, actor, Everybody Hates Chris, Phineas and Ferb
 Timothy Mitchum, actor, The Lion King
 Audrey Munson, early 20th-century model
 Paul Napier, television and commercial actor, SAG leader
 Hugh O'Brian, actor, films and Wyatt Earp television series
 Michael Park, actor, As the World Turns
 Chris Perfetti, actor, Abbott Elementary
 Richard Ryder, actor, Forever Young
 Keesha Sharp, actress, director
 Brennan Swain, contestant, The Amazing Race
 Joy Tanner, actress
 Tom Villard, actor, We Got it Made
 Gloria Votsis, actress
 Jimmy Wallington, actor and radio personality
 Kristen Wiig, comedian and actress, Saturday Night Live

Comedians
 Foster Brooks
 Jay Jason

Dancers and choreographers
 Aesha Ash, ballet dancer
 Garth Fagan, choreographer, considers Rochester home base
 Sybil Shearer

Musicians
Thanks in part to the Eastman School of Music, Rochester has an especially rich musical legacy, most notably as the birthplace of Cab Calloway and the hometown of jazz great Chuck Mangione.  Lou Gramm of Foreigner is also a native, while Gene Cornish of The Rascals is a more recent transplant.  Jeff Tyzik is one of the great jazz arrangers and pops conductors.  A number of nationally known musicians have passed through the halls of the Eastman School, either as students or professors (or both).

Classical music
 David Diamond, composer
 Renée Fleming, soprano
 Adolphus Hailstork, composer
 Howard Hanson, composer and conductor
 David Hochstein, virtuoso violinist
 Claire Huangci, pianist
 Daniel Katzen
 Gregory Kunde, tenor
 Ward Stare, conductor and trombonist
 Jeff Tyzik, conductor and jazz trumpeter
 William Warfield, bass-baritone
 Alec Wilder, composer
 Zvi Zeitlin, violinist and teacher

Jazz, big bands, and blues
 Cab Calloway, bandleader
 Chet Catallo, Guitarist, Spyro Gyra, Chet Catallo and the Cats,
 Hank D'Amico, clarinetist
 JT Bowen, R&B singer
 Steve Gadd, drummer
 Michael Hashim, saxophonist
 Son House, bluesman
 Vijay Iyer, jazz pianist
 Nancy Kelly, jazz singer
 Chuck Mangione, smooth jazz flugelhornist
 Gap Mangione, bandleader
 Roy McCurdy, drummer
 Mitch Miller, bandleader
 John Mooney, Bluesiana
 Famoudou Don Moye, drummer, Art Ensemble of Chicago
 Gerry Niewood, saxophonist
 Joe Romano, jazz saxophonist
 Frank Strazzeri, jazz pianist
 John Viavattine, Mambo Kings

Popular music
Lou Gramm, lead singer of Foreigner, and Gene Cornish of The Rascals might be the best-known pop musicians from Rochester. Gary Lewis (of Gary Lewis and the Playboys) came to the area late in life but now calls it home. Notable bands whose members are largely or entirely Rochesterians include Gym Class Heroes, Joywave, Rustix, SNMNMNM, and The Sunstreak.

 Steve Alaimo, teen idol pop singer, hosted and co-produced Dick Clark's Where the Action Is
 Gene Cornish, The Rascals
 Rivers Cuomo, Weezer
 Brann Dailor, Mastodon
 Steve Decker, Gym Class Heroes
 Joe English, drummer for Wings and Sea Level
 Teddy Geiger
 Kim Gordon, Sonic Youth
 Lou Gramm, Foreigner
 DJ Green Lantern, rapper
 RXK Nephew, rapper
 Mick Guzauski, mixer
 Davey Havok, AFI and Blaqk Audio
 Duke Jupiter
 Bill Kelliher, Mastodon
 Gary Lewis, Gary Lewis and the Playboys
 Disashi Lumumba-Kasongo, Gym Class Heroes (From nearby Ithaca, NY)
 Lydia Lunch
 Travis McCoy, Gym Class Heroes (From nearby Geneva, NY)
 Matt McGinley, Gym Class Heroes (From nearby Geneva, NY)
 Bob Nastanovich, Pavement
 Mike Piano, The Sandpipers
 Don Potter
 Bobby Orlando, producer
 Emilio Rojas, rapper
 David Schuler, The Sunstreak
 Jacob Stanczak, better known as Kill the Noise, Disk Jockey and producer
 Peter Shukoff ("NicePeter")
 Joyce Sims
 William Tell, Something Corporate
 Tweet, born Charlene Keys
 Virus, aka Andre Karkos, Device, Big & Rich, Dope, Lords of Acid
 Leehom Wang, C-pop
 Wendy O. Williams, Plasmatics
 Tim Yeung, Divine Heresy, Morbid Angel

Others
 Robert Bernhardt, symphony conductor
 The Campbell Brothers, instrumental gospel quartet
 Christine Lavin, folk singer/songwriter
 Julia Nunes, folk ukelelist and singer/songwriter
 Lauren O'Connell, folk singer/songwriter
 Lesley Riddle, 'human tape recorder' during A.P. Carter's song collecting excursions
 Ferdinand Jay Smith III, composer, promoter, advertising executive

Other
 Raul daSilva, author, filmmaker
 Thérèse DePrez, production designer
 Andrea Nix Fine, Oscar-winning documentary producer, Inocente
 Sean Fine, Oscar-winning documentarian, Inocente 
 Jason Hawes, founder of the Atlantic Paranormal Society and Sci Fi Channel series Ghost Hunters
 Jenna Mourey, YouTube personality, screen name "Jenna Marbles"
 James Sibley Watson, grandson of Western Union founders Hiram Sibley and Don Alonzo Watson; doctor and filmmaker
 Andrew Rea, Creator/Host of popular YouTube cooking series "Binging with Babish"

Government

Politicians and leaders
 Parmenio Adams, U.S. Representative
 Nathaniel Allen, U.S. Representative
 Fernando C. Beaman, U.S. Representative
 Charles Billinghurst, U.S. Representative from Wisconsin
 Harmon P. Burroughs, Illinois state representative
 Angus Cameron, U.S. Senator from Wisconsin
 Sanford E. Church, Lieutenant Governor of New York, New York State Comptroller, and Chief Judge of New York State Court of Appeals
 Edward Colman, Wisconsin state senator
 Cornplanter, leader of the Seneca
 Robert Duffy, former Rochester Police Chief, Rochester's 65th Mayor, and NYS Lieutenant Governor, President and CEO of the Greater Rochester Chamber of Commerce;
 Marion B. Folsom, Secretary of Health, Education and Welfare
 John Rankin Gamble, U.S. Representative from South Dakota
 John W. Gunning, Wisconsin State Assemblyman
 Leopold Hammel, Wisconsin State Assemblyman
 Elizur K. Hart, U.S. Representative and founder of Rochester Post-Express newspaper
 David J. Hayes, Deputy Secretary of the Interior
 Charles H. Holmes, U.S. Representative
 Kenneth Keating, U.S. Representative, senator, and ambassador to Israel
 Robert L. King, state assemblyman, county executive, and chancellor of the State University of New York
 Brian Kolb, Minority Leader of the New York State Assembly
 Charles H. Nesbitt, assemblyman and assembly minority leader
 Bill Nojay, assemblyman, public authority leader, and radio talk show host
 William F. Quinn, Governor of Hawaii
 John Raines, state senator
 Eliakim Sherrill, politician and brigade commander in Union Army during Civil War
 Louise Slaughter, U.S. Representative, chairperson of House Rules Committee
 Ellicott R. Stillman, Wisconsin State Assemblyman
 Thomas Benton Stoddard, first mayor of La Crosse, Wisconsin, and state assemblyman
 James W. Symington, Chief of Protocol of the United States (1966–68) and U.S. Representative (1969–77)
 John Todd Trowbridge, Wisconsin territorial legislator and sea captain
 Tom Warner, representative in Florida State Legislature

Judges and lawyers
 Benjamin Cunningham, Supreme Court Justice
 Robert Khuzami, deputy U.S. Attorney
 Donald Mark, New York Supreme Court Justice
 Robert R. Thomas, Chief Justice of the Supreme Court of Illinois and former NFL player

Military personnel
Military personnel best known as astronauts are listed below under "Scientists".
 Brigadier General John F. Albert, Deputy Chief of Chaplains of the U.S. Air Force
 Corporal Richard Brookins, the "American St. Nick" of World War II
 Brigadier General Frank Merrill Caldwell, Brigade commander in World War I
 Major General Mary E. Clarke, director of the Women's Army Corps; first woman to attain the rank of major general in the US Army
 Lieutenant Colonel Elmer W Heindl, WWII Chaplain
 General Francišak Kušal, commander of the Byelorussian Home Defence
 George Lennon Irish Republican Army leader during the Irish War of Independence and the Irish Civil War.
 Major General Daniel McCallum, head of the United States Military Railroad
 Major General William Augustus Mills, served during the defense of the Niagara frontier in the War of 1812
 Colonel Patrick O'Rorke

Media

Authors and writers
 Isabella Macdonald Alden, author
 John Ashbery, poet
 Natallia Arsiennieva, poet
 Nicholson Baker, author
 Andrea Barrett, short-story writer
 Philip Barry, playwright
 Richard Brookhiser, biographer
 Marcia Brown, Caldecott-winning author
 Rob Byrnes, writer, Lambda Literary Award winner
 Ron Carlivati, head writer of One Life to Live, General Hospital
 Tom Chiarella, writer for Esquire
 Francis Pharcellus Church, publisher and editor
 Henry W. Clune, journalist and novelist
 Sheila Connolly, mystery writer
 Cornelius Eady, poet
 Thomas Fenton, screenwriter, Saw IV
 Edith Willis Linn Forbes, poet and writer
 Joseph Fornieri, historian, political scientist
 Dana Fox, screenwriter, The Wedding Date
 Geoffrey Giuliano, biographer
 Virginia Haviland, librarian and writer
 Edward D. Hoch, mystery writer
 Mary Jane Holmes, 19th-century author
 David Hudson, lawyer and writer
 Charles R. Jackson, author of The Lost Weekend
 Shirley Jackson, author, The Lottery
 David Cay Johnston, Pulitzer Prize winner, reporter for New York Times
 Ilya Kaminsky, Ukrainian-American poet
 Garson Kanin, playwright and screenwriter
 Mollie Katzen, chef and cookbook author
 Stanton Davis Kirkham, naturalist
 Michael Muhammad Knight, novelist
 Helen Aldrich De Kroyft (1818–1915), author
 Sonja Livingston, author
 Jerre Mangione, writer
 Minerva Brace Norton, educator and author
 Linda Sue Park, Newbery Medal winner
 Jane Marsh Parker, author, historian and clubwoman
 Herbie J Pilato, writer
 Marjorie Kinnan Rawlings, author, Pulitzer Prize winner for The Yearling
 David Oliver Relin, journalist and author, Three Cups of Tea
 Julia Sauer, librarian and author
 David Schickler, author, Kissing in Manhattan and Sweet and Vicious
 Emma Augusta Sharkey, writer
 Mark Shulman, children's author
 Joe Simon, comic book writer, co-creator of Captain America
 Lura Eugenie Brown Smith (1864–?), journalist, newspaper editor, author
 Thomas Thackeray Swinburne (1865–1926), poet
 Chris Van Etten, TV writer and author

Broadcasters and journalists
 Don Alhart, television journalist
 Ralph Bown, radio pioneer
 Richard Ben Cramer, journalist and author, Pulitzer Prize winner
 Jean Giambrone, journalist, first woman credentialed for Masters golf
 Sean Lahman, sports statistician and newspaper journalist
 John Machacek, Pulitzer Prize winner (1972, spot reporting)
 Don Martin, Calgary Herald columnist
 Anne Montgomery, WROC sports reporter and ESPN broadcaster
 Henry Jarvis Raymond, journalist and founder of New York Times
 Neil Rogers, radio host
 Martin Sargent, professional "nerd" and host of TWIF
 Steve Scully, C-SPAN host; reporter and anchor at WHEC-TV in Rochester
 Jimmy Wallington, radio personality
 Irv Weinstein, television journalist

Sport broadcasters
 Mike Catalana, Rochester television executive
 Lanny Frattare, Pittsburgh Pirates
 Hank Greenwald, San Francisco Giants
 Josh Lewin, Los Angeles Chargers and Texas Rangers
 Clem McCarthy, sportscaster and newsreel narrator
 Nick Nickson, Jr., Los Angeles Kings
 Bill Stern, sportscaster in National Radio Hall of Fame
 Jeff Van Gundy, pro basketball
 Pete Van Wieren, Atlanta Braves

Photographers and artists

Metalwork sculptor Albert Paley, although originally from Philadelphia, has lived and worked in Rochester for over four decades; he's probably the region's most prominent artist.  Like many other artists, he came to Rochester because of RIT's School for American Crafts.
 Alfred Agate, painter
 Frederick Styles Agate, painter
 Harry Bliss, cartoonist
 Wendell Castle, wood furniture sculptor
 Arthur Dove, abstract painter
 Emil Gruppe, impressionist painter
 Nicholas Gurewitch, creator of The Perry Bible Fellowship
 Peter Hannan, creator of CatDog
 James D. Havens, woodcut artist; early insulin recipient
 Maud Humphrey, commercial illustrator, suffragist; mother of actor Humphrey Bogart
 Jeannette Klute, photographer
 Marilyn Leavitt-Imblum, needlework designer
 Albert Paley, metalwork sculptor
 Manuel Rivera-Ortiz, photographer

Other
 Larry Ashmead, book editor

Religion and philosophy
 Reverend Francis Bellamy, wrote the Pledge of Allegiance
 Antoinette Brown Blackwell, first female minister
 James Callan, former Catholic priest
 Kate, Leah, and Margaret Fox, spiritualists
 Philip Kapleau, brought Zen Buddhism to western mainstream 1964; founded Rochester Zen Center
 Max Landsberg (1845–1927), rabbi of B'rith Kodesh
 Bishop Bernard John McQuaid
 Carolyn Merchant, philosopher and historian
 Walter Rauschenbusch, theologian
 Abraham Resnick, rabbi in Ashgabat, Kokand, Moscow, Quincy MA, Lowell MA and Rochester
 Benjamin Titus Roberts, founder, Free Methodist Church
 Bishop Fulton Sheen, archbishop and television personality
 Joseph Smith, founder of Latter Day Saint movement
 Paul J. Swain, Roman Catholic bishop
 Reverend Dr. Howard Thurman
 Hiram Edson, Pioneer of the Seventh-day Adventist Church known for introducing the sanctuary doctrine (investigative judgment) to the church.
The Millerite message came to Rochester, New York, in 1843 and soon spread to Port Gibson.
Isaac and Amy Post, were radical Hicksite Quakers from Rochester, New York, and leaders in the nineteenth-century anti-slavery and women's rights movements. Among the first believers in Spiritualism, they helped to associate the young religious movement with the political ideas of the reform movement.

Scientists
Pioneering physician Elizabeth Blackwell, pioneering astronaut Pamela Melroy, and naturalist Henry Augustus Ward are the most notable scientists to come from the Rochester area. Acclaimed surgeon Seymour I. Schwartz also made Rochester his home.
 James C. Adamson, astronaut
 John Auer, physiologist and pharmacologist credited with the discovery of Auer rods
 Elizabeth Blackwell, first woman to become qualified as a medical doctor
 Esther M. Conwell, physicist, 1997 recipient of the IEEE Edison Medal
 Frank J. Duarte, laser physicist and author
 Grove Karl Gilbert, geologist
 David Lipman, bioinformaticist
 Edward Tsang Lu, space shuttle astronaut, International Space Station resident
 Pamela Melroy, astronaut
 Lewis Henry Morgan, anthropologist
 Arthur Caswell Parker, archaeologist, historian, expert on Native Americans, and director of the Rochester Museum of Arts and Sciences
 John Wesley Powell, geologist
 Mark Rosenzweig, research psychologist
 Seymour I. Schwartz, author of Schwartz's Principles of Surgery, the "Surgeon's Bible"
 Lewis A. Swift, astronomer
 Ching W. Tang, chemist, physicist, inventor of OLED
 Henry Augustus Ward, naturalist and geologist, founder of Ward's Natural Science
 John Ralston Williams, medical pioneer
 Herbert York, nuclear physicist

Social reformers
No list of notable Rochesterians could ever omit Susan B. Anthony and Frederick Douglass, but the area has a long history of progressive social reformers.  Anarchist Emma Goldman lived there for a time.
 Terry A. Anderson, former hostage and humanitarian
 Susan B. Anthony, women's rights leader
 Walter Cooper, research scientist, urban education reformer and civil rights activist
 Frederick Douglass, abolitionist
 Lavantia Densmore Douglass (1827–1899), social reformer
 Emma Goldman, anarchist
 George W. Goler, pioneer in pasteurisation
 Shields Green, escaped slave who participated in John Brown's raid on Harpers Ferry
 Jean Brooks Greenleaf (1832–1918), woman suffragist
 Hester C. Jeffrey, suffragist
 Clarissa Caldwell Lathrop, asylum reform advocate and autobiographer
 Helen Barrett Montgomery, social reformer and women's activist
 Helen Pitts, abolitionist and feminist
 Joy Powell, social reformer, political prisoner and anti-violence activist
 Mabel Sine Wadsworth, birth control activist
 Lillian Wald, public health nurse and social worker
 Samuel Ringgold Ward, African-American pastor and abolitionist
 Frances Willard, suffragist and temperance reformer
 Fannie Barrier Williams, black social reformer

Others
 Josh Arieh, 2005 World Series of Poker champion
 Timothy Blodgett, Sergeant at Arms of the U.S. House of Representatives as of January 2021 
 Mabel Boll, socialite, the "Queen of Diamonds"
 Douglas Brei, sports historian
 Obadiah Bush, ancestor of the Bush financial and political family
 Elizabeth Eden, figure in the Dog Day Afternoon bank heist
 Ed Edmondson, chess arbiter
 Jon Finkel, Magic: The Gathering champion
 Jerome Fuller, jurist
 Mike Goodman, professional gambler, casino pit boss, and author
 Gideon Granger, U.S. Postmaster General under Thomas Jefferson
 Seth Green, pioneer in fish farming
 Mary Jemison, the White Lady of the Genesee
 Lincoln Kirstein, writer, ballet impresario, art connoisseur, and one of the Monuments Men
 Thomas Krens, former director, current senior adviser, at the Solomon R. Guggenheim Museum
 Increase A. Lapham, "father" of the United States Weather Service
 Christopher Lasch, historian
 Belva Ann Lockwood, first female attorney to practice before the Supreme Court
 Shawn Rabideau, event planner, TV personality
 Nathaniel Rochester, city founder
 Blanche Stuart Scott, first American woman aviator
 Jane Teller, sculptor

Fictional Rochesterians
 Luke and Joanne Collins, and son Dennis Collins, Heroes Reborn
 Rosalie Hale, vampire, Twilight

References

Sources
 

Rochesterians
Rochester